Henri Piet (1 January 1888 – 4 May 1915) was a French Lightweight boxer. He is notable for his EBU lightweight challenge against Freddie Welsh, winning the French welterweight belt in 1912. He died in the boxing ring in 1915, aged 27.

Boxing career
Piet rose to prominence as a lightweight boxer when he challenged Freddie Welsh for the EBU (European) lightweight title. The fight took place at Mountain Ash on 23 August 1909. Piet lasted until the twelfth round when his knee gave way and he retired from the fight. Afterwards Welsh stated that Piet was "The classiest boy I met since I came over, he will trim up a lot of fancied boxers if he goes to the States."

Notes

External links

 

1888 births
1915 deaths
Boxers from Paris
Deaths due to injuries sustained in boxing
French male boxers
Lightweight boxers
Sport deaths in France